Jiyuan, was a protected cruiser  of the Imperial Chinese Navy, assigned to the Beiyang Fleet. She was constructed in Germany as China lacked the industrial facilities needed to build them at the time. Upon completion, she was prevented from sailing to China during the Sino-French War.

In the First Sino-Japanese War, she was involved in the Battle of Pungdo, and at the Battle of Yalu River, which resulted in the subsequent execution of her captain. Under the Japanese flag, she was used to bombard positions in the Japanese invasion of Taiwan, and was sunk on 30 November 1904 after striking a Russian mine during the Battle of Port Arthur of the Russo-Japanese War.

Design
When Jiyuan was originally ordered by the Imperial Chinese Navy, she was to be the third  ironclad battleship built by AG Vulcan Stettin in Stettin, Germany. The Chinese had been seeking larger warships from British shipyards, but negotiations had stalled. They turned instead to German shipyards, who the Chinese managed to negotiate a deal with. The orders for the three ironclads were placed following the construction of the German . Due to funding issues, she was instead reduced in size to that of a protected cruiser, and the planned build of up to a dozen ships were reduced to just those three.

She was normally fitted with a single military mast, but for the sea voyage from Germany to China she was equipped with additional masts and sails.

Her main armament was her two breech-loading  Krupp guns, mounted in a barbette at towards the front of the ship. She had a further  Krupp gun mounted in a rear barbette, five Hotchkiss guns and four above water mounted torpedo tubes.

Career

China
Jiyuan was laid down on 16 January 1883. After being launched from the yard in Stettin on 1 December, she was completed in August the following year. Due to the ongoing Sino-French War, the three Stettin-built ships were prevented from travelling to China and were held up for the following ten months. On 3 July 1885, Jiyuan,  and  set off from Kiel, Germany, on the voyage to China, equipped with a German crew. They stopped on the way in Devonport, England; Gibraltar; Aden, Yemen and Colombo, Sri Lanka. At the end of October, the ships arrived at the Taku Forts in China, where Chinese crews were embarked. Their arrival signalled the creation of a new post-war Beiyang Fleet with the battleships at the centre of the formation.

The fleet was based out of the newly expanded Port Arthur (now Lüshunkou District), however since the port froze over during the winter, both Jiyuan and the battleships would spend part of the year in Shanghai. Several ships of the Beiyang Fleet sailed to Hong Kong from Shanghai at the end of 1889, including Jiyuan. They sailed onto Singapore, before returning to Shanghai during the following April.

First Sino-Japanese War

By the time of the First Sino-Japanese War in 1894, Jiyuan was captained by Fang Pai-chen. She was among several ships to be assigned as escorts to troopships heading to Korea in June 1894. Jiyuan departed on 22 July alongside the gunboat  from Weihaiwei (now Weihai) for Asan in Korea, beginning the return journey on 25 July. The two ships were meant to meet up with the troopship Kowshing, but instead were confronted by three cruisers of the Imperial Japanese Navy in the Battle of Pungdo. Jiyuan attempted to pass close to the Japanese cruiser , as her captain anticipated a short-range torpedo attack. The other two Japanese cruisers,  and  also began firing on Jiyuan.

Jiyuan was hit by a multitude of shells, disabling her forward-mounted Krupp gun and severely damaging all the structures above her armour belt. Captain Fang gave orders to flee at full speed towards Waihaiwei, with Yoshino in pursuit. Reports differed on why Jiyuan was not overtaken by the faster Japanese cruiser, with one claim stating that Jiyuans aft mounted Krupp gun scored a hit on the bridge of the Yoshino, and another indicating that shot was fired by the Kuang Yi. While Jiyuan got away, the Kuang Yi fought against the remaining two cruisers until she was holed and sinking, at which point she was beached to allow her crew to escape. As the Tsi Yuan headed to Weihaiwei, she passed the Kowshing which was still heading to Korea. The troop ship was stopped by the Japanese, and after prolonged negotiations she was sunk with loss of a great number of the troops and crew on board.

Upon her arrival at Weihaiwei, she was sent onto Port Arthur for repairs. Captain Fang of the Jiyuan was court-martialled for his actions but found not guilty and returned to duty. Jiyuan was repaired and rejoined the fleet on 7 August in Weihaiwei, shortly before the Japanese attacked the port three days later, bombarding the defensive forts before leaving. On 17 September, at the Battle of Yalu River, she was at the far left of the Chinese line and in a fighting pair with the cruiser . Jiyuan signalled early on that she was damaged, and was withdrawn. The ship was manoeuvred into some nearby shallows where the crew found it difficult to steer the vessel, and instead steamed back into the engagement.  While doing so, it collided with the Chinese cruiser Chaoyong, which subsequently sank. At some point during the battle, Captain Fang was relieved of his duties by First Lieutenant Shen Sou Ch'ang, but Fang returned to command after Shen was killed.

Jiyuan then travelled back to Port Arthur, where the foreign engineer refused to serve the captain of the vessel any longer, and left. Captain Fang Peh-Kien was executed for his actions in the battle, with command passed to First Lieutenant Huang Tsu-Lien. Of the surviving Chinese warships from the battle, the Jiyuan was the least damaged. As the other surviving ships from the battle arrived in Port Arthur, their guns were dressed in red. Jiyuan was the exception, with no decoration and was docked away from the other vessels.

She was of one several Chinese ships caught in the harbour of Weihaiwei when the Japanese laid siege over the winter in early 1895 in the Battle of Weihaiwei. Huang refused to leave Jiyuan to seek treatment for injuries sustained during the battle; instead his wounds were dressed and he continued in his duties. He was then shot through the thigh, and continued to refuse treatment. A few minutes later he was killed by an explosive shell fired by a Japanese vessel. Admiral Ding Ruchang, in command of the fleet, surrendered on 12 February, and committing suicide shortly afterwards. In exchange for the surrender of all war material including the fleet, good behaviour was promised by the Japanese. Jiyuan was later commissioned into the Imperial Japanese Navy as Saien, the same Chinese character name.

Japan

Saien was pressed immediately into Japanese service. During the Japanese invasion of Taiwan later in 1895, she was assigned together with six other ships to bombard the coastal defences of Takow (Kaohsiung). The fleet arrived off the coast on 12 October, warning foreign vessels that the attack would begin at 7am the following morning. The Japanese ships attacked on schedule, firing on the defenses until they stopped returning fire after half an hour. At 2pm, the ships closed the distance to the beach and began launching boats into the water with troops. Their forces had successfully captured the coastal fort by 2:35pm.

The Japanese refitted Saien in 1898, replacing her existing light guns with eight quick-firing 3 pounders. While supporting the Imperial Japanese Army following the Battle of Port Arthur during the opening stages of the Russo-Japanese War of 1904–1905, Saien struck a submerged Russian mine on 30 November 1904. Eight crewmen in the engine room were killed immediately by the explosion, with the cruiser sinking rapidly over the following two minutes. During this time only two boats could be launched, saving 70 of the crew, along with a collection of various items entrusted to them by the officers such as the signal book and some paintings of the Imperial family.

The gunboat  was nearby bombarding enemy positions, and diverted to the Saien following the explosion. Together, a total of 191 officers and crew were saved between the launches, the Akagi and another gunboat. Saien Captain Tajima was lost, as were another 39 men. The loss of the Saien was thought to be insignificant due to her age and capabilities compared to the other ships of the Japanese fleet.

Notes

References

 

 

 
 

Cruisers of the Beiyang Fleet
Cruisers of Germany
Ships built in Stettin
1883 ships
First Sino-Japanese War cruisers of China
Naval ships of China
Captured ships
Cruisers of the Imperial Japanese Navy
Russo-Japanese War cruisers of Japan
Maritime incidents in 1904
Shipwrecks in the Yellow Sea
Shipwrecks of the Russo-Japanese War
Ships sunk by mines